Jeh Williamson (born 15 December 1990) is an Indian footballer who currently plays for Bhawanipore in the I-League 2nd Division. He is an official youth product of Pune.

Williamson’s love for football developed thanks to his father, Jerome, who began to personally train Williamson at the age of sixteen. However, Williamson's football career can actually be traced back to his school days, which included leading the side as well.

Williamson’s interest, coupled with having an equally determined father, led to the creation of the football club Morning Glory, in 2004. The amateur club provided a platform for Williamson to showcase his talent.

His fascination with goals was a good enough reason for Williamson to stay put as a striker.

Early career
In 2007, Williamson had his first trial with playing organised football by enrolling in a youth training program with the Southern Sports Association. It was a six-month regular exercise for the player.

His potential at SSA earned him a break at FCI, where he spent a season under former Internationals Bikash Panji, Atanu Bhattacharya, and Biswajeet Bhattacharya.

The following year, in 2009, Williamson was selected to play for the Calcutta Cricket & Football Club (CCFC). This part of his career was crucial as the club, which was coached by Jamshed Nassiri, played weekend games against big clubs from Kolkata. His promise led to the coach allowing Williamson to try out for the Pune F.C. under-19 team. Williamson made it to the team.

Career

Pune
In the summer of 2011, Williamson signed with the senior team at Pune F.C., and made his first-team debut against Prayag United S.C. in the I-League, coming off the bench as a substitute in the 71st minute on 5 November 2011.

Career statistics

Club
Statistics accurate as of 6 November 2011

References

Indian footballers
1990 births
Living people
Footballers from Kolkata
I-League players
I-League 2nd Division players
Pune FC players
Bhawanipore FC players
United Sikkim F.C. players
Association football forwards